Cyanophos is a cholinesterase inhibitor used as an insecticide and avicide; for example, against rice stem borers and house flies. It is part of the chemical class of organophosphorus compounds, and is a yellow to reddish-yellow transparent liquid.

Safety
Cyanophos can enter the body via inhalation, ingestion, and contact with the skin and eyes. Symptoms of cyanophos poisoning resemble those of the chemical weapon sarin and include dyspnea, vomiting, diarrhea, abdominal pain, bronchorrhea, blurred vision, and opsoclonus.

It is classified as an extremely hazardous substance in the United States as defined in Section 302 of the U.S. Emergency Planning and Community Right-to-Know Act (42 U.S.C. 11002), and is subject to strict reporting requirements by facilities which produce, store, or use it in significant quantities.

Synonyms
 BAY 34727
 Bayer 34727
 Ciafos
 Cyanofos
 Cyanox
 Cyap
 ENT 25,675
 O,O-dimethyl O-(4-cyanophenyl) phosphorothioate
 O,O-dimethyl O-(p-cyanophenyl) phosphorothioate
 O,O-dimethyl O-4-cyanophenyl phosphorothioate
 O,O-dimethyl O-4-cyanophenyl thiophosphate
 O,O-dimethyl-O-p-cyanophenyl phosphorothioate
 O-p-cyanophenyl O,O-dimethyl phosphorothioate
 Phosphorothioic acid O-(4-cyanophenyl) O,O-dimethyl ester
 Phosphorothioic acid, O,O-dimethyl ester, O-ester with p-hydroxybenzonitrile
 Phosphorothioic acid, O-p-cyanophenyl O,O-dimethyl ester
 S 4084
 Sumitomo S 4084

References

Acetylcholinesterase inhibitors
Organophosphate insecticides
Nitriles
Organothiophosphate esters